C. sativa may refer to:
 Camelina sativa, the gold-of-pleasure or false flax, a flowering plant species native to Northern Europe and to Central Asia
 Cannabis sativa, an annual plant species better known as marijuana
 Castanea sativa, the sweet chestnut, a tree species known for its edible seeds originally native to southeastern Europe and Asia Minor

See also
 Sativa